Eagle Nest is a historic plantation house located near Pink Hill, Jones County, North Carolina. It was built about 1800 and is a two-story, four-bay by three-bay, Federal style frame dwelling.  It rests on a brick foundation, is sheathed in weatherboard, and has a gable roof with exterior end chimneys. It has two one-story frame rear additions. The front facade features a two-tier engaged porch with an enclosed east end.  Also on the property is a contributing smokehouse.

It was listed on the National Register of Historic Places in 1974.

References

Plantation houses in North Carolina
Houses on the National Register of Historic Places in North Carolina
Federal architecture in North Carolina
Houses completed in 1800
Houses in Jones County, North Carolina
National Register of Historic Places in Jones County, North Carolina